"Nada" (English: "Nothing") is a 2013 bachata song by American recording artist Prince Royce. The song was released in March 2014 as the third single lifted from Royce's third studio album, Soy el Mismo (2013).

Music video
The music video was released on 28 March 2014.

Chart performance

Awards and nominations

References

2013 songs
2014 singles
Prince Royce songs
Bachata songs
Songs written by Prince Royce
Sony Music Latin singles